The 2002 Tata Open was a men's tennis tournament played on outdoor hard courts at the SDAT Tennis Stadium in Chennai, India and was part of the International Series of the 2002 ATP Tour. The tournament ran from 31 December 2001 until 6 January 2002. Guillermo Cañas won the singles title.

Finals

Singles

 Guillermo Cañas defeated  Paradorn Srichaphan 6–4, 7–6(7–2)
 It was Cañas's 1st title of the year and the 4th of his career.

Doubles

 Mahesh Bhupathi /  Leander Paes defeated  Tomáš Cibulec /  Ota Fukárek 5–7, 6–2, 7–5
 It was Bhupathi's 1st title of the year and the 22nd of his career. It was Paes's 1st title of the year and the 25th of his career.

References

External links
 Official website
 ATP tournament profile

 
Tata Open
Tata Open
Chennai Open